Conor Kerr is a Canadian writer from Edmonton, Alberta. His debut novel Avenue of Champions, published in 2021, was the winner of the ReLit Award for Fiction in 2022, and was shortlisted for the 2022 Amazon.ca First Novel Award and longlisted for the 2022 Giller Prize.

Of Métis and Ukrainian background, Kerr currently lives in Vancouver, British Columbia. Named for the ceremonial name of 118 Avenue in Edmonton as the "Avenue of Champions" due to the location of the Northlands Coliseum, the novel focuses on the coming of age of a young Métis man.

Kerr has also published the poetry collection An Explosion of Feathers. In 2019 he was the winner of The Fiddlehead's Ralph Gustafson Poetry Prize, and in 2021 he was the winner of the Malahat Review's Long Poem Prize.

References

21st-century Canadian novelists
21st-century Canadian poets
21st-century Canadian male writers
Canadian male novelists
Canadian male poets
Métis writers
Writers from Edmonton
Year of birth missing (living people)
Living people